Tunoa Lui is an American Samoan football coach who trained the national team of American Samoa for a period of one year. He left resigned from the position in 2001. Since 2017 he is the coach of the American Samoa national under-18 futsal team.

Biography 
Lui was in charge of American Samoa in the 31–0 loss against Australia in a qualifying match for the 2002 World Cup.

Tunoa Lui, who was appointed only a year before, left on the 30th of July, 2001. The American Samoa national team was then without a coach for two years before the appointment of Ian Crook in 2003.

He later coached Samoa's football team for the Oceania Cup.

References

External links 
 

American Samoa national football team managers
Living people
American Samoan football managers
Samoa national football team managers
Year of birth missing (living people)